Anomostachys is a plant genus of the family Euphorbiaceae first described as a genus in 1951. It contains one known species, Anomostachys lastellei, endemic to Madagascar.

Description
Anomostachys lastellei is a tree which grows up to 20 meters high.

Range and habitat
Anomostachys lastellei is native to Antananarivo, Antsiranana, Fianarantsoa, Toamasina, Toliara and Mahajanga provinces of eastern Madagascar.

It inhabits the humid lowland forests and mid-elevation montane forests from 80 to 1,150 meters elevation. It is found in primary forests and degraded vegetation, on humus, sandy, rocky, or quartzitic soils.

References

Hippomaneae
Monotypic Euphorbiaceae genera
Endemic flora of Madagascar
Taxa named by Henri Ernest Baillon
Flora of the Madagascar lowland forests
Flora of the Madagascar subhumid forests